Nélson Roberto Magalhães Sampaio (born 4 April 1992 in Marco de Canaveses, Porto District) is a Portuguese footballer who plays for Amarante F.C. as a central defender or a defensive midfielder.

External links

1992 births
Living people
People from Marco de Canaveses
Portuguese footballers
Association football defenders
Association football midfielders
Association football utility players
Liga Portugal 2 players
Segunda Divisão players
AC Vila Meã players
Leixões S.C. players
F.C. Penafiel players
F.C. Felgueiras 1932 players
C.D. Trofense players
S.C. Praiense players
AD Oliveirense players
C.D. Cinfães players
Amarante F.C. players
Sportspeople from Porto District